Golden Seals can refer to:

California Golden Seals, a professional hockey team
San Francisco Seals (ice hockey), an earlier iteration of that team
Columbus Golden Seals, a minor league hockey team
The Golden Seals, a Canadian indie rock band

See also
The Golden Seal, a 1983 film
Goldenseal, a perennial herb